Richard "Rick" Krueger (born February 13, 1949) is an American educator and politician.

Born in Saint Paul, Minnesota, Kruger received his bachelor's degree from Winona State University, his master's degree in education from University of St. Thomas (Minnesota), his master's degree from Harvard University in public administration, and his doctorate degree in educational administration from Harvard University. He was an administrator in the Staples, Minnesota School District. He served in the Minnesota House of Representatives from 1983 to 1994 as a Democrat. After leaving the Minnesota Legislature, Krueger was appointed executive director of the Minnesota Transportation Alliance (MTA). He was then appointed senior government affairs manager for the Global Traffic Technology (GTT).

Notes

1949 births
Living people
Politicians from Saint Paul, Minnesota
People from Staples, Minnesota
Harvard University alumni
University of St. Thomas (Minnesota) alumni
Winona State University alumni
Democratic Party members of the Minnesota House of Representatives
20th-century American educators
20th-century American politicians